Cruz Salmerón Acosta is a municipality of Sucre, Venezuela. The capital is Araya.

Municipalities of Sucre (state)